Newton Abbot Spurs Association Football Club is a football club based in Newton Abbot, Devon.

History
The club was established in August 1938 by Eric Butler, Fred Stopp and Terry Waye. They joined the South Devon Minor League, although the outbreak of World War II meant that the club spent the early 1940s playing friendly matches. In 1945 they joined the South Devon League, going on to win the league title in their first season in the league, as well as the Herald Cup, beating Bishopsteignton 9–0 in the final. They then joined the Devon & Exeter League, and were runners-up in 1946–47, as well as winning the East Devon Senior Cup. The club transferred to the Plymouth & District League in 1947 and went on to win the Plymouth & District Charity Cup in 1947–48.

The 1949–50 season saw Newton Abbot Spurs win the Plymouth & District League title and the Devon Senior Cup. After retaining the Senior Cup and finishing as runners-up in the league the following season, the club were founder members of the South Western League. However, in 1953 the club dropped back into the Plymouth & District League. In 1956 they rejoined the Exeter & District League and were champions in 1958–59, also winning the East Devon Senior Cup, after which they moved back up to the South Western League. The club finished bottom of the league in 1969–70 and left at the end of the following season, returning to the South Devon League.

After finishing as runners-up in Division Two in 1976–77, Spurs were promoted to the South Devon League's Premier Division. This started an era of success as the club won the Premier Division title in 1979–80, 1980–81, 1982–83, 1983–84, 1985–86, 1989–90,, 1992–93, 1993–94 and 1995–96, as well as the Devon Premier Cup in 1984–85 and 1990–91, the Devon Senior Cup in 1990–91, the Challenge Shield five times and the Herald Cup on four occasions. They moved up to the Devon County League in 1996. In 2007 the league merged with the South Western League to form the South West Peninsula League, with the club placed in the Premier Division.

Spurs finished bottom of the Premier Division in 2008–09 and were relegated to Division One East.

Ground
The club initially played at Bakers Park, before moving to the recreation ground in 1947.

Honours
South Devon League
Champions 1945–46, 1979–80, 1980–81, 1983–84, 1985–86, 1989–90, 1992–93, 1993–94, 1995–96
Challenge Shield winners 1980–81, 1981–82, 1985–86, 1989–90, 1992–93
Herald Cup winners 1945–46, 1982–83, 1984–85, 1991–92, 1994–95
Devon & Exeter League
Champions 1958–59
Plymouth & District League
Champions 1949–50
Devon Premier Cup
Winners 1984–85, 1990–91
Devon Senior Cup
Winners 1949–50, 1950–51 (shared), 1990–91
East Devon Senior Cup
Winners 1946–47, 1958–59
Plymouth & District Charity Cup
Winners 1947–48

Records
Best FA Cup performance: Second qualifying round, 1947–48

See also
Newton Abbot Spurs A.F.C. players
Newton Abbot Spurs A.F.C. managers

References

External links

 
Football clubs in England
Football clubs in Devon
Association football clubs established in 1938
1938 establishments in England
Newton Abbot
South Devon Football League
Devon and Exeter Football League
South Western Football League
Devon County League
South West Peninsula League